Fetzer may refer to:

Fetzer (surname)
Fetzer Field, sports field in North Carolina, United States
Fetzer Institute, organization based in Michigan, United States